Rossella Brescia (born 20 August 1971) is an Italian television presenter, radio presenter, and dancer. She has hosted  Uman - Take Control! on Italia 1 and  Baila! on Canale 5.

Filmography

As an actress

As herself

References

Living people
Italian television presenters
Italian women television presenters
1971 births
People from Martina Franca
21st-century Italian women